The 1960 United States presidential election in Washington took place on November 8, 1960, as part of the 1960 United States presidential election. State voters chose nine representatives, or electors, to the Electoral College, who voted for president and vice president.

Washington was won by incumbent Vice President Richard Nixon (R–California), running with United States Ambassador to the United Nations Henry Cabot Lodge, Jr., with 50.68% of the popular vote, against Senator John F. Kennedy (D–Massachusetts), running with Senator Lyndon B. Johnson, with 48.27% of the popular vote.

Results

Results by county

See also
 United States presidential elections in Washington (state)

References

Washington
1960
1960 Washington (state) elections